Ivester is a surname. Notable people with the surname include:

Douglas Ivester (born 1947), American businessman
Tom Ivester (born 1969), American politician

See also
Ivester, Iowa, an unincorporated community in the US state of Iowa